Les Authieux-sur-le-Port-Saint-Ouen is a commune in the Seine-Maritime department in the Normandy region in northern France.

Geography

Population

Places of interest
 The church of St.Saturnin, dating from the thirteenth century.
 A 300m long cave in a hillside.

See also
Communes of the Seine-Maritime department

References

External links

Official website of the commune 

Communes of Seine-Maritime